Stephen Deane  was an Irish politician.

Deane was born in Dublin educated at Trinity College, Dublin.

Deane represented Inistioge from 1717 to 1727.

References

Irish MPs 1715–1727
Members of the Parliament of Ireland (pre-1801) for County Kilkenny constituencies
18th-century Irish politicians
Alumni of Trinity College Dublin
Politicians from Dublin (city)